Polyipnus laternatus is a species of ray-finned fish in the genus Polyipnus. It is found throughout the Caribbean Sea and the Gulf of Mexico in waters from 370 - 500 meters.

References

Sternoptychidae
Fish described in 1899